Madi is a Rural municipality located within the Rolpa District of the Lumbini Province of Nepal.
The rural municipality spans  of area, with a total population of 17,986 according to a 2011 Nepal census.

On March 10, 2017, the Government of Nepal restructured the local level bodies into 753 new local level structures.
The previous Gharti Gaun, Talawang, Karchawang (excluding some portion), portion of Wot and Bhawang VDCs were merged to form Madi Rural Municipality.
Madi is divided into 6 wards, with Gharti Gaun declared the administrative center of the rural municipality.

Demographics
At the time of the 2011 Nepal census, Madi Rural Municipality had a population of 17,986. Of these, 90.6% spoke Nepali, 9.0% Magar and 0.4% other languages as their first language.

In terms of ethnicity/caste, 54.5% were Magar, 27.8% Chhetri, 12.2% Kami, 4.6% Damai/Dholi, 0.3% Thakuri, 0.3% other Dalit, 0.2% Hill Brahmin and 0.1% Musalman.

In terms of religion, 70.1% were Hindu, 22.1% Buddhist, 4.5% Christian, 1.1% Prakriti, 0.1% Muslim and 2.1% others.

References

External links
official website of the rural municipality

Rural municipalities in Rolpa District
Rural municipalities of Nepal established in 2017